C. E. Byrd, a Blue Ribbon School, is a high school in Shreveport, Louisiana, United States. In continuous operation since its establishment in 1925, C. E. Byrd is also the eighth-largest high school in the United States of America as of February 2019. Byrd students come from its neighborhood or throughout the entire school district through its selective math/science magnet program.

History
 1892: C. E. Byrd came to Shreveport as principal of the first public high school, in two rented rooms in the YMCA building at a salary of $70 per month.
 1898: With first year enrollment of 70, the school moved to the Soady building on Crockett Street.
 1899: Moved to new Hope Street School, a large three story red brick building. Elementary students occupied the first floor, intermediate the second, and high school the third.
 1910: Shreveport High School built adjacent to Hope Street.
 1923: Caddo Parish School Board decides to build two new high schools.  Site purchased from Justin Gras for $110,000 and four adjacent lots in Bon Air Subdivision, from F.R. Chadick for $9,500.
 1924: Stewart-McGee awarded the building contract for $772,133. On October 3, cornerstone laid with full Masonic ceremonies including a letter from C. E. Byrd; a boll weevil symbolizing problems of the farmer; a bottle of oil, symbolic of the oil business; an ear of corn representing agriculture; coins representing the financial situation, and a Bible.

 1925: Board authorized $40,000 to furnish the building. Building accepted from the contractor on June 27. Because furniture had not yet arrived, the opening was delayed until October.

1960s -1970s: Desegregation
 1967: First African-American graduate, Arthur Burton.
 1968: As part of an order to desegregate, neighborhood school district boundaries were abolished and students were allowed to select schools under a protocol known as "Freedom of Choice."  Courts found this policy did not accomplish desegregation
 1969: New districts were created in the summer of 1969 forcing thousands of students to change schools.  Faculty from historically black high schools were exchanged with those from historically white high schools and students from Captain Shreve  High School returned to Byrd as their neighborhood school.

1970: In an attempt to further desegregate, Valencia High School (now Caddo Magnet High School) was merged with Byrd. Students class schedules were changed at the start of the new semester in order to "mix" the students from the two schools. The Black administrators from Valencia were given minor roles at Byrd.

Tensions were high with student protests.  As a result of these protests, police were called in to guard the doors of the school.  Students were not allowed to leave the building once they came to school for the day.  Senior rings had been ordered the previous year, so each wore their own class rings.  While students from both schools participated in the same commencement exercises they wore different colored academic regalia, that represented their schools.

Byrd High subsequently fell victim to "white flight" with many parents sending their children to Jesuit High School (now Loyola), St. Vincent's Academy, or one of several new private schools.  Enrollment decreased to the point that Byrd faced possible closure.  Byrd returned as a powerhouse by re-inventing itself as a Math and Science magnet school.

The  area comprising the school building and three other non-contributing properties were added to the National Register of Historic Places in 1991. The elaborate four story brick structure designed by Edward F. Neild has seen several alterations since its construction in 1924. The structure, however, still retains its original visual impact and is significant in the area of architecture. Byrd remains one of few examples of Jacobean Revival architecture.

Student media

 Literary magazine: Perspectives
 Newspaper: Highlife
 TV station: K-BYRD
 Yearbook: Gusher

Athletics
C. E. Byrd High athletics competes in the LHSAA.

Championships
Football championships
(10) State Championships: 1914, 1915, 1922, 1926, 1930, 1931, 1934, 1935, 1937, 1949

Coaches
Lee Hedges, football

Notable alumni
Edward C. Aldridge Jr. (1956), president and CEO of The Aerospace Corporation
John N. Bahcall, astrophysicist known for his work on solar neutrino problem
Fuller W. Bazer (1956), O.D. Butler Chair in Animal Science at Texas A&M; Wolf Prize in Agriculture
Betsy Boze, Ph.D. (formerly Betsy Vogel) (1971), President, The College of The Bahamas
Karen Carlson, actress
Judith A. Cooper (1967) (born 1949), speech pathologist 
John Howard Dalton (1959), former U.S. Secretary of the Navy
Jordan Davis (2006) (born 1988), country singer
Tillman Franks (1940), songwriter
Brandon Friedman (1996), former Deputy Assistant Secretary, United States Department of Housing and Urban Development; author of The War I Always Wanted
Helen Lefkowitz Horowitz (1959), 2003 Pulitzer Prize in history
Tom Jarriel (1952), ABC News journalist
Faith Jenkins, Miss Louisiana 2000, Miss America 2001 first runner-up, attorney and legal analyst
Victor Joris, fashion designer.
William Joyce, Academy Award winner, children's book author and illustrator
Merle Kilgore (1952), singer, songwriter, and manager
Aaron Selber, Jr. (1944) (1927–2013), businessman and philanthropist
Andy Sidaris (1948) (1931–2007), television producer, director (B movies), actor and writer
Shelby Singleton, record producer and record label owner
William T. Whisner, Jr. (1923–1989), flying ace in World War II and Korean War

Elected officials and judiciary 
Saxby Chambliss (1961) (born 1943), Republican U.S. senator from Georgia, 2002–2015
George W. D'Artois (c. 1942) (1925–1977), Shreveport public service commissioner from 1962–1976
William J. Fleniken (c. 1925) (1908–1979), U.S. Attorney for United States District Court for the Western District of Louisiana, 1950–1953, judge of state 1st Judicial District Court in Shreveport, 1961–1979
   Frank Fulco (1928) (1909–1999), Louisiana House of Representatives (1956–1972)
Pike Hall, Jr. (c. 1947) (1931–1999), member of Caddo Parish School Board 1964–1970; state appeal court judge 1971–1990, associate justice of the Louisiana Supreme Court 1990–1994
   James C. Gardner (1940) (1924–2010), Shreveport mayor (1954–1958) and state representative (1952–1954)
William T. "Bill" Hanna (1947) (1930–2016), Shreveport Democratic mayor (1978–1982) and Caddo Parish administrator
Eric Johnson (Georgia politician) (1953) Georgia state senator, 1994–2009
J. Bennett Johnston, Jr. (1950) (born 1932), Louisiana Democratic U.S. senator (1972–1997)
   Robert Kostelka (1949) (born 1933), Louisiana state senator and former state court judge from Ouachita Parish
Charles B. Peatross (1958) (1940–2015), judge of Louisiana Second Circuit Court of Appeal in Shreveport
   Virginia Kilpatrick Shehee (1940) (1923–2015), Chairman, Kilpatrick Life Insurance Company, former state senator from Caddo Parish
Phil Short (1965) (born 1947), former state senator from St. Tammany Parish; United States Marine Corps officer
Art Sour (c. 1941) (1924–2000), Shreveport Republican state legislator (1972–1992)
Tom Stagg (1939) (1923–2015), judge of the United States District Court for the Western District of Louisiana
Jeffrey P. Victory (1963) (born 1946), former associate justice of Louisiana Supreme Court 
Jacques L. Wiener, Jr. (1952), U.S. Circuit Court judge

Athletes
Arnaz Battle (1998), wide receiver for NFL's San Francisco 49ers and Pittsburgh Steelers
Harry Davis (1908–1997), Major League Baseball player
Pat "Gravy" Patterson (1934–2007), Byrd High School coach 1963–1967
Seth Morehead (1934-2006), Major League Baseball pitcher
Scotty Robertson (1947), head coach of NBA's New Orleans Jazz, Chicago Bulls and Detroit Pistons
Dan Sandifer (1943), defensive back for six NFL teams
David Woodley, quarterback at LSU (1976–1979), played for Miami Dolphins (1980–1983) and the Pittsburgh Steelers (1984–1985)
Jonathan Stewart (2009), linebacker at Texas A&M (2009–2013), played for St. Louis Rams, Cleveland Browns and Dallas Cowboys
Pat Studstill, NFL punter and wide receiver for Detroit Lions, Los Angeles Rams
James Sykes (1971), football player, Calgary Stampeders 1975–1982; Winnipeg Blue Bombers 1983 and 1986
Isaac Hagins (1972), football player, Tampa Bay Buccaneers 1976–1980
Liffort Hobley (1978-1980), QB, DB, Football Player, at LSU 2 times Defensive MVP at Safety, St. Louis Football Cardinals(1985-1986) and Miami Dolphins (1987-1993)

See also

National Register of Historic Places listings in Caddo Parish, Louisiana

References

External links
Official school site
Caddo Parish School Board

School buildings on the National Register of Historic Places in Louisiana
Tudor Revival architecture in Louisiana
School buildings completed in 1924
Magnet schools in Louisiana
Educational institutions established in 1925
High schools in Shreveport, Louisiana
Public high schools in Louisiana
National Register of Historic Places in Caddo Parish, Louisiana
1925 establishments in Louisiana